Life Begins for Andy Hardy is a 1941 American comedy film and the 11th installment of the 16 popular Andy Hardy movies. Directed by George B. Seitz, Life Begins for Andy Hardy was also the last Andy Hardy movie to feature Judy Garland.

Plot 
With high school behind him, Andy Hardy (Mickey Rooney) decides that as an adult, it's time to start living his life on his own. Judge Hardy (Lewis Stone) recommends that his son would go to college and study law, but Andy isn't sure that's what he wants to do so he heads off to New York City to find a job. With high spirits and a new car, he drives to New York City with his childhood friend Betsy Booth (Judy Garland).

Andy soon meets there another young man who had just been fired as an "office boy" at a midtown firm.  When Betsy rushes Andy there unannounced to apply for the vacancy, Betsy patiently circles the congested streets for hours waiting for him to come out.  She eventually runs out of fuel, and Andy does not land the job due to a family member acquiring it before him. Andy lives without a job for several weeks, too proud to accept financial help from well-to-do Betsy until the office receptionist visits his apartment to inform him the job is free, the nephew having lost the job. He even gets to repeatedly date the office receptionist, a more worldly woman who (in addition to the office staff) is amused at his naivete and sometimes clumsiness.  He learns that daily expenses, including gifts and dates for his new girlfriend, quickly add up. He also mourns over the death of his new friend.

Andy is nearly fired after, due to drowsiness, he mixes up two outgoing letters in the office mail.  Although ashamed to let his parents know of his difficulties, they hear of his circumstances from Betsy, and his father goes to bring him home.  After facing these several lessons of life, Andy concludes that he may still have some growing up to do and gets a job at the car repair shop in his hometown, knowing he is knowledgeable about them.

Cast 
 Lewis Stone as Judge James K. 'Jim' Hardy
 Mickey Rooney as Andy Hardy
 Fay Holden as Mrs. Emily Hardy
 Ann Rutherford as Polly Benedict
 Sara Haden as Aunt Milly Forrest
 Patricia Dane as Jennitt Hicks
 Ray McDonald as Jimmy Frobisher
 Judy Garland as Miss Betsy Booth

Box office
According to MGM records the film earned $1,684,000 in the US and Canada and $810,000 elsewhere resulting in a profit of $1,324,000.

References

External links 

 
 
 
 

1941 films
1941 comedy films
American comedy films
American black-and-white films
Films set in New York City
Metro-Goldwyn-Mayer films
Films directed by George B. Seitz
1940s English-language films
1940s American films